The Mack MD is a series of medium duty (Class 6 and 7) trucks to be built by Mack Trucks. It has a short, low-profile hood and a high-visibility cab. It is designed as straight trucks for local delivery, construction, and other vocational jobs. The MD was introduced in February 2020 entered full production in July 2020.

Design 
The MD is a short-hood conventional. Designed for local use it has a day-cab only. It has two axles with the rear one driven.

Mack doesn't build any medium-duty components and uses a vendor engine, transmission, and axles.

Engine and transmission 
A Cummins B6.7L diesel engine is used. It is a 6.7L turbocharged inline six-cylinder engine.

An Allison 6-speed transmissions is used. They are fully automatic planetary gear transmission with a lock-up torque converter.

Chassis 
A ladder frame with beam axles is used. Meritor supplies both the front and driven rear axles.

Applications 
Mack is marketing the MD for local box van, stake/flatbed, dump, and tanker use.

References 

MD
Vehicles introduced in 2020